|}

This is a list of electoral district results of the 1959 Western Australian election.

Results by Electoral district

Albany 

 Two party preferred vote was estimated.

Avon Valley

Beeloo 

 Two party preferred vote was estimated.

Blackwood

Boulder

Bunbury

Canning 

Two party preferred vote was estimated.

Claremont

Collie

Cottesloe

Dale

Darling Range

East Perth

Eyre

Fremantle 

 Preferences were not distributed.

Gascoyne

Geraldton 

 Two party preferred vote was estimated.

Greenough

Guildford-Midland

Harvey

Kalgoorlie 

 Two party preferred vote was estimated.

Katanning

Kimberley

Leederville

Maylands

Melville

Merredin-Yilgarn

Middle Swan 

 Two party preferred vote was estimated.

Moore

Mount Hawthorn

Mount Lawley

Mount Marshall

Murchison

Murray

Narrogin

Nedlands

North Perth

Northam 

 Two party preferred vote was estimated.

Pilbara

Roe

South Fremantle

South Perth

Stirling

Subiaco

Toodyay

Vasse

Victoria Park 

 Two party preferred vote was estimated.

Warren 

 Two party preferred vote was estimated.

Wembley Beaches 

 Two party preferred vote was estimated.

West Perth

See also 

 1959 Western Australian state election
 Candidates of the 1959 Western Australian state election
 Members of the Western Australian Legislative Assembly, 1959–1962

References 

Results of Western Australian elections
1959 elections in Australia